Lokhandwala Minerva is a 79-floor supertall skyscraper under construction in Mumbai, Maharashtra, India. It will have two towers of 79 floors, each of which will encompass parking floors from 5th to 13th, two triple-heighted levels of World Class Amenities from floors 14th to 19th, 5-heighted open-to-sky Podium Landscape Garden on 20th floor with 2 Banquet Halls through floors 20 to 24 and a service level on the 25th floor, residential floors from 26th to 77th, and two penthouses from floors 77 to 79. There will be a transfer girder on level 50 and a service level right above that on level 51, dividing the tower into two separate configurations: 3 BHK's below and 4 BHK's above. When completed, this will be the tallest completed building in India standing at 300m, beating the tallest completed building in India World One tower.

Location 
The Lokhandwala Minerva is located in Mahalaxmi, Mumbai.

See also
List of tallest buildings in Mumbai
List of tallest buildings in India

References

External links
Official website
Neil Mukesh Launch Lokhandwala Builders Minerva Pictures
Emporis.com 
Launch Video
Launch Photos 
 Launch Video

Buildings and structures under construction in India
Residential skyscrapers in Mumbai